Marxist League may refer to:

Marxist League (India), a political grouping in Bombay, India
Marxist League of Kerala, an alliance of leftwing elements in Kerala, India during the 1960s
Communist League (UK, 1932), later reorganised as the "Marxist League"

See also
Marxist-Leninist League (disambiguation)